Calycobathra is a genus of moth in the family Cosmopterigidae.

Species
Calycobathra acarpa Meyrick, 1891
Calycobathra arabicella Kasy, 1968
Calycobathra calligoni Sinev, 1979
Calycobathra pakistanella Kasy, 1968
Calycobathra sahidanella Kasy, 1968
Calycobathra striatella Kasy, 1968
Calycobathra variapenella Sinev, 1984

References
Natural History Museum Lepidoptera genus database

Chrysopeleiinae